Michejda is a Polish surname typical for the region of Cieszyn Silesia, where the members of Michejda family were traditionally active in Polish and Lutheran public life. Notable people include:

 Tadeusz Michejda (1879-1956), Polish physician and politician
 Władysław Michejda (1876-1937), Mayor of Cieszyn

References 

Polish-language surnames
Cieszyn Silesia